Leucopogon exolasius, commonly known as Woronora beard-heath, is a species of flowering plant in the heath family Ericaceae and is endemic to a small area of New South Wales. It is an erect shrub with oblong or elliptic leaves, and drooping, white, tube-shaped flowers.

Description
The edges of the leaves are turned down or rolled under, the upper surface convex and the lower surface striated.

Taxonomy
Woronora beard-heath was first formally described in 1867 by Ferdinand von Mueller who gave it the name Styphelia exolasia in his Fragmenta Phytographiae Australiae from specimens collected by Ludwig Leichhardt near the village of Camden. In 1868, George Bentham changed the name to Leucopogon exolasius in Flora Australiensis. The specific epithet (exolasius) means "hairy on the outside", referring to the floral tube.

Distribution and habitat
Leucopogon exolasius is only known from a few locations in the Sydney region and on the Central Coast of New South Wales, including along the Georges River, in Heathcote National Park and along the Grose River. It grows in woodland, often on sandstone hillsides along creek banks.

Conservation status
Leucopogon exolasius is listed as "vulnerable" under the Australian Government Environment Protection and Biodiversity Conservation Act 1999 and the New South Wales Government Biodiversity Conservation Act 2016. The threats to the species include its small population size, habitat loss, weed invasion and inappropriate fire regimes.

References

exolasius
Ericales of Australia
Flora of New South Wales
Plants described in 1867
Taxa named by Ferdinand von Mueller